John E. Brooks, S.J., (July 13, 1923 – July 2, 2012) was an American Jesuit priest who  joined the Society of Jesus in 1950. He served from 1970 to 1994 as the 28th president of the College of the Holy Cross, in Worcester, Massachusetts.

Career
Before becoming a priest, Brooks graduated from Boston Latin School in 1942, then enlisted in the U.S. Army Signal Corps in 1943, serving in the European Theater of Operations from 1944-46. He graduated from the College of the Holy Cross with a bachelor of arts in 1949 and Pennsylvania State University for graduate studies in geophysics. He was a member of the Faculty of the Theology Department at Holy Cross and served as Vice President and Dean of College. He also served as Chair of Religious Studies and Theology. During his presidency, he and Peter Likins of Lehigh University were the two college presidents contacted by the Ivy League in the first stage of the formation of the Patriot League during the early-1980s. Following his retirement as President in 1994, Brooks remained at the College as President Emeritus.

In 1968, Brooks recruited a group of young African-American men to study at Holy Cross. A 2007 article in BusinessWeek suggested that "Brooks helped shape an exceptional group of overachievers", including Clarence Thomas and Edward P. Jones as chronicled in the 2012 book on the integration of Holy Cross, "Fraternity" by Diane Brady.
Brooks Music Hall is named in honor John Brooks, one of the only halls named after a person while they were alive. Construction of the building was overseen by Father Brooks' nephew Paul F. Brooks Jr.

Death
After being treated for lymphoma at the University of Massachusetts Memorial Medical Center-University Worcester Campus, Brooks died on July 2, 2012, at age 88.

References

1923 births
2012 deaths
20th-century American Jesuits
21st-century American Jesuits
College of the Holy Cross alumni
Pennsylvania State University alumni
Presidents of the College of the Holy Cross
United States Army personnel of World War II
Deaths from lymphoma
Deaths from cancer in Massachusetts
Boston Latin School alumni
United States Army soldiers